John Divers may refer to:
John Divers (footballer, born 1873), Scottish international footballer who played for Hibernian, Celtic and Everton 
John Divers (footballer, born 1911), Scottish international footballer who played for Celtic, Morton and Oldham
John Divers (footballer, born 1931), footballer who played in Clyde's Scottish Cup winning side of 1954–1955 and later for Exeter City and East Stirlingshire
John Divers (footballer, born 1940), son of the footballer born 1911, played for Celtic and Partick Thistle